Natalya Igorevna Negoda (born 12 November 1963, Moscow) is a Russian actress best-known for her portrayal of Vera in the film Little Vera (Маленькая Вера) – the first ever Soviet film to include a sex scene. She later appeared in Playboy magazine.

Negoda moved to the United States in the early 1990s but returned to Russia in 2007. She has been a vocal critic of Vladimir Putin and his policies, and she signed a statement calling for the government to free Pussy Riot.

Selected filmography
 Tomorrow Was the War (1987)
 Little Vera (1988)
 How Dark the Nights Are on the Black Sea (1989)
 Back in the USSR (1992)
 The Comrades of Summer (1992)
 Tambourine, Drum (2009)

References

External links
 

1963 births
Living people
Russian film actresses
Soviet film actresses
Recipients of the Nika Award
Academicians of the Russian Academy of Cinema Arts and Sciences "Nika"
20th-century Russian actresses
21st-century Russian actresses
Moscow Art Theatre School alumni